The Battle of Derasge was fought on 9 February 1855 between Kassa Hailu's forces and the forces of Wube Haile Maryam, Dejazmatch of Tigray. Kassa won the battle, and two days later was crowned Tewodros II of Ethiopia at the church of Derasge Mariam near Mekane Berhan.

See also
 Battle of Gur Amba

References

Battles involving Ethiopia
Battles of the Zemene Mesafint
1855 in Ethiopia
Conflicts in 1855
February 1855 events